The 2013–14 Slovak Cup, also known as Slovnaft Cup for sponsorship reasons, was the 45th edition of the competition. 43 clubs participated in the tournament. The winners of the competition, qualify for the Second qualifying round of the 2014–15 UEFA Europa League.

First round
First round matches were played on 6 & 7 August 2013.

 1 Kalinkovo forfeited meaning that Šamorín progress to the next round.

Second round
Second round matches were played on 27 & 28 August 2013.

Third round
Third round matches were played on 24 & 25 September 2013.

Quarter-finals
Quarterfinals matches were played on 22 & 23 October 2013 (first legs) and 5 & 6 November 2013 (second legs).

First Legs

 † Senica were awarded a 3–0 win over Zlaté Moravce. The match originally finished with a 2–1 win for Zlaté Moravce.

Second Legs

Semi-finals
Semifinals matches were played on 8 April 2014 (first legs) and 15 April 2014 (second legs).

First Legs

Second Legs

Final

References

Slovak Cup seasons
Cup
Slovak Cup